The men's discus throw at the 1962 British Empire and Commonwealth Games as part of the athletics programme was held at the Perry Lakes Stadium on Monday 26 November 1962.

Selvey won by  ahead of Scotsman Mike Lindsay and England's John Sheldrick who won the bronze medal.

Records

Final

References

Men's discus throw
1962